Michel Lejeune (30 January 1907 – 27 January 2000) was a French linguist, a specialist in the sound changes of Ancient Greek.  He was a member of the Académie des inscriptions et belles-lettres.

1907 births
2000 deaths
Linguists from France
École Normale Supérieure alumni
Members of the Académie des Inscriptions et Belles-Lettres
20th-century linguists
Corresponding Fellows of the British Academy